Crüe Fest was a summer 2008 tour by Mötley Crüe, which commenced on July 1, 2008 and concluded on August 31, 2008. It featured Mötley Crüe themselves, Buckcherry, Papa Roach, Sixx:A.M., and Trapt. Crüe Fest was said to be "the Loudest Show on Earth". The tour earned around $40 million and was the most successful, most popular festival of the summer.

Origins
The tour was formulated in January 2008 by Nikki Sixx. Shortly afterwards, the idea was established to involve both bands of whom Sixx was then a member: Mötley Crüe and Sixx:A.M. Crüe Fest was born: a new touring festival of 'bands that embody the spirit of rock and roll' in the same vein as Ozzfest. Mötley's official website, had promised a special announcement and, on April 15, 2008, the band hosted a press conference, where they announced the tour, premiered their "Saints of Los Angeles" video, and performed "Kickstart My Heart" and "Saints of Los Angeles".

Tour dates

DVD

On March 24, 2009, the Crüe Fest DVD was released. The main concert was filmed on August 28, 2008 at the Molson Amphitheatre in Toronto, with some clips filmed at the other venues of the tour. The film was directed by P.R. Brown and was filmed in high definition with 5.1 stereo audio. The DVD reached number one on the Billboard Top Music Video chart, selling 7,000 copies in its first week of release.

Track listing
Disc one:
Mötley Crüe
"Opening"
"Kickstart My Heart"
"Wild Side"
"Shout at the Devil"
"Saints of Los Angeles"
"Live Wire"
"Sick Love Song"
"Tit E Cam"
"Mutherfucker of the Year"
"Don't Go Away Mad (Just Go Away)"
"Same Ol' Situation (S.O.S.)"
"Primal Scream"
"Looks That Kill"
"Girls, Girls, Girls"
"Dr. Feelgood"
"Home Sweet Home"

Disc two:
Trapt
"Contagious"
"Headstrong"

Sixx:A.M.
"Opening"
"Pray for Me"
"Life Is Beautiful"

Papa Roach
"Opening"
"Time Is Running Out"
"Forever"
"Last Resort"

Buckcherry
"Opening"
"Lit Up"
"Sorry"
"Crazy Bitch"

Bonus features
 Crüe Fest 2008 All "Excess" Pass Documentary
 Music videos
"White Trash Circus"
"Saints of Los Angeles"
"Primal Scream"
"Looks That Kill"
"Live Wire"
"Kickstart My Heart"

References

Mötley Crüe concert tours
Mötley Crüe live albums
Buckcherry albums
Papa Roach albums
Rock festivals in the United States
Heavy metal festivals in the United States
2008 concert tours
Summer festivals
Live video albums
2009 video albums
2009 live albums
Mötley Crüe video albums